The following works deal with the cultural, political, economic, military, biographical and geologic history of the Midwestern United States.

Overviews
 Cayton, Andrew R. L. Midwest and the Nation (1990)
 Cayton, Andrew R. L. and Susan E. Gray, eds. The Identity of the American Midwest: Essays on Regional History. (2001)
 Cayton, Andrew R. L. and Peter S. Onuf, eds. The American Midwest: Rethinking the History of an American Nation (1990)
 Good, David F. "American History through a Midwestern Lens." Wirtschaft und Gesellschaft 38.2 (2012): 435+ online; emphasis on economic history
 Hurt, R. Douglas.  The Big Empty: The Great Plains in the Twentieth Century (University of Arizona Press; 2011) 315 pages; the environmental, social, economic, and political history of the region.
 Lauck, Jon K. "Why the Midwest Matters." The Midwest Quarterly 54.2 (2013): 165+
 Nordin, Dennis S., and Roy V. Scott. From Prairie Farmer to Entrepreneur: The Transformation of Midwestern Agriculture. (2005) 356pp.
 Sisson, Richard, Christian Zacher, and Andrew Cayton, eds. The American Midwest: An Interpretive Encyclopedia (Indiana University Press, 2006), 1916 pp of articles by scholars on all topics covering the 12 states
 Walker, Kenneth R. A History of the Middle West From the Beginning to 1970 (1972) 552pp the only textbook
 Wertenbaker, Thomas J. "The Molding of the Middle West." American Historical Review (1948): 223-234. in JSTOR
 Wishart, David J. ed. Encyclopedia of the Great Plains, University of Nebraska Press, 2004, . complete text online

Historiography
 Billington, Ray Allen. "From Association to Organization: The OAH in the Bad Old Days." Journal of American History (1978): 75-84. in JSTOR
 Brown, David S. Beyond the Frontier: The Midwestern Voice in American Historical Writing (2009)
 Buck, Solon J. "The Progress and Possibilities of Mississippi Valley History," Mississippi Valley Historical Review (1923) 10#1 pp. 5–20 in JSTOR
 Clark, Thomas D. "Our Roots Flourished in the Valley." Journal of American History (1978): 85-107. in JSTOR
 Howard, Joseph Kinsey. "New Concepts of Plains History." Montana Magazine of History (1952): 16-23. in JSTOR
 Kirkendall, Richard S., ed. The Organization of American Historians and the Writing and Teaching of American History (Oxford University Press, 2011)
 Lauck, Jon K. "The Prairie Historians and the Foundations of Midwestern History." Annals of Iowa (2012) 71#2 pp: 137-173.
 Lauck, Jon K. The Lost Region: Toward a Revival of Midwestern History (University of Iowa Press; 2013) 166 pages; criticizes the neglect of the Midwest in contemporary historiography and argues for a revival of attention excerpt
 Madison, James H., ed. Heartland: Comparative Histories of the Midwestern States (Indiana UP, 1988)
 Ross, Earle D. "A Generation of Prairie Historiography." Mississippi Valley Historical Review 33#3 (1946) pp: 391-410. in JSTOR
 Tyrrell, Ian. "Public at the Creation: Place, Memory, and Historical Practice in the Mississippi Valley Historical Association, 1907-1950," Journal of American History (2007) 94#1 pp. 19–46 in JSTOR

Before 1783
 Fisher, James. "A Forgotten Hero Remembered, Revered, and Revised: The Legacy and Ordeal of George Rogers Clark." Indiana Magazine of History (1996): 109-132. online
 Pauketat, Timothy R. Cahokia: Ancient America’s Great City on the Mississippi  (2009)
 White, Richard. The Middle Ground: Indians, Empires, and Republics in the Great Lakes region, 1650-1815 (1991)

Frontier Era: 1783-1850
 Barnhart, John D. Valley of Democracy: The Frontier versus the Plantation in the Ohio Valley, 1775-1818 (1953)
 Billington, Ray Allen, and Martin Ridge. Westward Expansion: A History of the American Frontier (5th ed. 2001); 892 pp; textbook with 160pp of detailed annotated bibliographies
 Buley, R. Carlyle. The Old Northwest: Pioneer Period 1815–1840 2 vol (1951), Pulitzer Prize
 Etcheson, Nicole. Bleeding Kansas: Contested Liberty in the Civil War Era (2006)
 Lamar, Howard, ed. The New Encyclopedia of the American West (1998); this is a revised version of Reader's Encyclopedia of the American West ed. by Howard Lamar (1977)
 Larson, John Lauritz. "Teaching the West in the Early American Republic: Old Chestnuts and the Fruits of New Research." Magazine of History (2000): 17-20. in JSTOR, historiography
 Rodriguez, Junius P. ed. The Louisiana Purchase: A Historical and Geographical Encyclopedia (2002)
  Scheiber, Harry N. ed. The Old Northwest; studies in regional history, 1787-1910 (1969) 16 essays by scholars on economic and social topics
 Smelser, Marshall. "Tecumseh, Harrison, and the War of 1812," Indiana Magazine of History (March 1969) 65#1 pp 25-44 online
 Watts, Edward, and David Rachels, eds. The First West: Writing from the American Frontier, 1776-1860 (Oxford University Press, 2002), 960pp; primary sources  excerpt and text search
 Wyman, Mark. The Wisconsin Frontier (2009)

Civil War & Gilded Age
 Barker, Brett, et al. eds. Union Heartland: The Midwestern Home Front During the Civil War (2013).
 Gjerde, John. Minds of the West: Ethnocultural Evolution in the Rural Middle West, 1830–1917 (1999) excerpt and text search
 Jensen, Richard. The Winning of the Midwest: Social and Political Conflict, 1888–1896 (1971)   online free
Jordan, Philip D.Ohio Comes of Age: 1873-1900 Volume 5 (1968) online
 Kleppner, Paul. Cross of Culture (1970)
 Nye, Russel B. Midwestern Progressive Politics (1959)
  Scheiber, Harry N. ed. The Old Northwest; studies in regional history, 1787-1910 (1969) 16 essays by scholars on economic and social topics
 Thornbrough, Emma Lou. Indiana in the Civil War Era, 1850-1880 (1965); the standard scholarly history

1900 to 1940
 Billington, Ray Allen.  "The Origins of Middle Western Isolationism," Political Science Quarterly (1945) 60#1, 45-64. in JSTOR
 Bonnifield, Paul. The Dust Bowl: Men, Dirt, and Depression, (University of New Mexico Press,  1978)
 Shannon, Fred A. "The Status of the Midwestern Farmer in 1900" The Mississippi Valley Historical Review. (1950), 37#3 pp: 491–510. in JSTOR

1940 to  present
  Hurt, R. Douglas. The Great Plains during World War II. (U of Nebraska Press, 2008). Pp. 507pp.	
 Wuthnow, Robert.  Remaking the Heartland: Middle America since the 1950s (2011) comprehensive survey excerpt

Culture
 Hutton, Graham.  Midwest at Noon (1946), analysis of regional culture
 Rees, Amanda. The Great Plains Region: The Greenwood Encyclopedia of American Regional Cultures (2004); architecture, art, fashion, folklore, food, language, literature, music, religion, and sports
 Shortridge, James R. The Middle West: Its Meaning in American Culture (1989) excerpt and text search
  Slade, Joseph W.  and Judith Lee. The Midwest: The Greenwood Encyclopedia of American Regional Cultures (2004); architecture, art, fashion, folklore, food, language, literature, music, religion, and sports

Economics

Agriculture

 Atack, Jeremy and Fred Bateman. To Their Own Soil: Agriculture in the Antebellum North (Iowa State University Press, 1987)* Grant, Michael Johnston. Down and Out on the Family Farm: Rural Rehabilitation in the Great Plains, 1929-1945, (University of Nebraska Press, (2002)
 Hart, John Fraser. "Change in the corn belt." Geographical Review (1986) pp: 51-72. online 
 Jones, Robert Leslie. History of Agriculture in Ohio to 1880 (1983)
 Jones, Robert Leslie. "The Horse and Mule Industry in Ohio to 1865." Mississippi Valley Historical Review (1946): 61-88. in JSTOR
 Page, Brian and Richard Walker. "From Settlement to Fordism: The Agro-Industrial Revolution in the American Midwest," Economic Geography (1991) 67#4, 281-315.
 Shannon, Fred A. "The Status of the Midwestern Farmer in 1900" Mississippi Valley Historical Review (1950) 27#3 pp: 491–510. in JSTOR

Industry
 High, Stephen C. Industrial Sunset: The Making of North America’s Rust Belt, 1969-1984 (2003)
 Longworth, Richard C. Caught in the Middle: America’s Heartland in the Age of Globalism (2008)
 Meyer, David R. "Midwestern Industrialization and the American Manufacturing Belt in the Nineteenth Century", The Journal of Economic History,  Vol. 49, No. 4 (December, 1989) pp. 921–937.in JSTOR
 Page, Brian and Richard Walker. "From Settlement to Fordism: The Agro-Industrial Revolution in the American Midwest," Economic Geography (1991) 67#4, 281-315.

Labor
 Boryczka, Raymond, and Lorin Lee Cary. No Strength Without Union: An Illustrated History of Ohio Workers, 1803-1980 Ohio Historical Society, 1982.
 Critchlow, Donald (ed.). Socialism in the Heartland: The Midwestern Experience, 1900-1925. Notre Dame, IN: University of Notre Dame Press, 1986.
 Feurer, Rosemary. Radical Unionism in the Midwest, 1900-1950. Urbana, IL: University of Illinois Press, 2006.
 Higbie, Frank Tobias. Indispensable Outcasts: Hobo Workers and Community in the American Midwest, 1880-1930. (2003).
 Margo, Robert A. "Regional Wage Gaps and the Settlement of the Midwest." Explorations in Economic History (1999) 36#2 pp: 128-143.
 Nelson, Daniel. Farm and Factory: Workers in the Midwest 1880-1990.  (1995) online review
 Neth, Mary. "Gender and the Family Labor System: Defining Work in the Rural Midwest." Journal of Social History (1994): 563-577. in JSTOR
 Schob, David E. Hired Hands and Plowboys: Farm labor in the Midwest, 1815-60. (1975).
 Warren, Wilson J. Struggling with Iowa's Pride: Labor Relations, Unionism, and Politics in the Rural Midwest Since 1877. (2000)

Railroads and transportation

 Atack, Jeremy, et al. "Did railroads induce or follow economic growth? Urbanization and Population Growth in the American Midwest, 1850–1860." Social Science History 34.2 (2010): 171-197. online
 Campbell, Ballard.  "The Good Roads Movement in Wisconsin, 1890-1911," Wisconsin Magazine of History 49 (1966): 273-93
 
 Kane, Adam I. The Western River Steamboat (2004)
 Larson, John Lauritz. Bonds of enterprise: John Murray Forbes and western development in America's railway age (2010).
 Mercer, Lloyd J. "Land Grants to American Railroads: Social Cost or Social Benefit?" Business History Review (1969) 43#2 pp 134-151 in JSTOR
 Meyer, Balthasar Henry, and Caroline Elizabeth MacGill. History of Transportation in the United States before 1860 (1917). online
 White, Richard. Railroaded: The Transcontinentals and the Making of Modern America (2011)

Geography, land and environment
 Blouet, Brian W. and Frederick C. Luebke, eds. The Great Plains: Environment and Culture (U of Nebraska Press, 1979)
 Cronon, William. Nature's Metropolis: Chicago and the Great West (1992), 1850–1900 excerpt and text search
 Garland, John H. The North American Midwest: A Regional Geography (1955)
 Hart, John Fraser. "The Middle West." Annals of the Association of American Geographers (1972) 62#2 pp: 258-282. in JSTOR
 Rohrbough, Malcolm J.  The Land Office Business: The Settlement and Administration of American Public Lands, 1789-1837 (1968)
 Van Atta, John R. Securing the West: Politics, Public Lands, and the Fate of the Old Republic, 1785--1850 (2014)

Politics
 Buck, Solon J. The Granger Movement: A Study of Agricultural Organization and Its Political, Economic and Social Manifestations, 1870-1880 (1913) online
 Fenton, James H. Midwest politics (1966), voting patterns by state
 Lauck, Jon K. and Catherine McNicol Stock, eds. The Conservative Heartland: A Political History of the Postwar American Midwest (UP of Kansas, 2020) online review
 Pearce, Neal R.  The Great Plains States of America: People, Politics, and Power in the Nine Great Plains States (1973); in-depth coverage of politics and economy 
 Pearce, Neal R.  The Great Lakes States of America: People, politics, and power in the Five Great Lakes States (1980); in-depth coverage of politics and economy

Social history

Education
 Fuller, Wayne. The Old Country School: The Story of Rural Education in the Middle West (U of Chicago Press, 1982).
  Mattingly, Paul H. and Edward W. Stevens Jr. Schools and the Means of Education Shall Forever Be Encouraged: A History of Education in the Old Northwest, 1787-1880 (1987), 132pp
 Theobald, Paul. Call School: Rural Education in the Midwest to 1918 (Southern Illinois University Press, 1995)
 Wheeler, Kenneth H. Cultivating Regionalism: Higher Education and the Making of the American Midwest (2011)

Race
 Lehman, Christopher P. Slavery in the Upper Mississippi Valley, 1787-1865 (2011)
 Thornbrough, Emma Lou. Negro in Indiana before 1900 : a study of a minority 1993
 Thornbrough, Emma Lou. Indiana Blacks in the twentieth century (2001) online

Religion
 Barlow, Philip, and Mark Silk, eds. Religion and public life in the Midwest: America's common denominator? (2004)
 Bodensieck, Julius, ed. The encyclopedia of the Lutheran Church (3 vol 1965) vol 1 and 3 online free
 Brauer, James Leonard  and Fred L. Precht, eds. Lutheran Worship: History and Practice (1993)
 Gjerde, Jon. The Minds of the West: Ethnocultural evolution in the rural Middle West, 1830-1917 (1999)
 Granquist, Mark. Lutherans in America: A New History (2015)
 Madison, James H.  "Reformers and the Rural Church, 1900-1950," Journal of American History 73 (1986): 645-68.
 Meyer,  Carl S.  Moving Frontiers: Readings in the History of the Lutheran Church Missouri Synod (1986)
 Sweet, W.W. ed. Religion on the American Frontier (4 vol 1931-46), primary sources; lengthy volumes on Methodists, Baptists, Congregationalists, Presbyterians

Rural 
 Barron, Hal S. Mixed Harvest: the Second Great Transformation in the Rural North, 1870-1930 (1997).
 Douglas, Lake. "'To Improve the Soil and the Mind': Content and Context of Nineteenth-Century Agricultural Literature." Landscape Journal 25.1 (2006): 67-79.
 Fry, John. “Good Farming – Clear Thinking – Right Living”: Midwestern Farm Newspapers, Social Reform, and Rural Readers in the Early Twentieth Century.” Agricultural History 78#1 (2004): 34-49.
 Motz, Marilyn Ferris. "Folk Expression of Time and Place: 19th-Century Midwestern Rural Diaries." Journal of American Folklore  100#396 (1987): 131-147.  online
 Neth, Mary. Preserving the Family Farm: Women, Community, and the Foundations of Agribusiness in the Midwest, 1900-1945 (1995).
 Reynolds, David R. There goes the neighborhood: Rural school consolidation at the grass roots in early twentieth-century Iowa (U of Iowa Press, 2002).
 Riney-Kehrberg, Pamela. Childhood on the Farm: Work, Play, and Coming of Age in the Midwest (2005).
 Riney-Kehrberg, Pamela. “Farm Youth and Progressive Agricultural Reform: Dexter D. Mayne and the Farm Boy Cavaliers of America.” Agricultural History 85#4 (2011) 437-459.
 Weber, Margaret. "Making the best better: 4-H and rural anxiety in the early twentieth century." (MA thesis Iowa State University, 2013) online.

Settlement and ethnicity
 Aponte, Robert, and Marcelo Siles Cabrera. "Latinos in the heartland: The browning of the Midwest" (Julian Samora Research Institute, Michigan State University, 1994) online
 Gjerde, Jon. The Minds of the West: Ethnocultural evolution in the rural Middle West, 1830-1917 (1999)
 Hudson,  John C.  "North American Origins of Middlewestern Frontier Populations," Annals of the Association of American Geographers (1988) 78#3 pp: 395-413. in JSTOR
 Mathews, Lois Kimbell. The Expansion of New England: The Spread of New England Settlement and Institutions to the Mississippi River, 1620- 1865 (1909) online
 Power, Richard Lyle. Planting Corn Belt Culture: The Impress of the Upland Southerner and Yankee in the Old Northwest (1953).

Urban
 Bodenhamer, David, ed. The Encyclopedia of Indianapolis (1994)
 Muller, Edward K. "Selective urban growth in the Middle Ohio Valley, 1800-1860." Geographical Review (1976): 178-199. online; also in JSTOR
 Reiff, Janice L., Ann Durkin Keating, and James R. Grossman, eds. The Encyclopedia of Chicago (2005) complete online version
 Teaford, Jon C. Cities of the Heartland: The Rise and Fall of the Industrial Midwest (1993)
 Van Tassell, David, and  John J Grabowski, eds. The Encyclopedia of Cleveland History (2nd ed. 1996)

Women
 Aley, Ginette. "'Knotted Together Like Roots in the Darkness': Rural Midwestern Women and Region-A Bibliographic Guide." Agricultural history  (2003) 77#3 pp: 453-481. in JSTOR
 Aley, Ginette. "A Republic of Farm People: Women, Families, and Market-Minded Agrarianism in Ohio, 1820s–1830s." Ohio History (2007) 114#1 pp: 28-45. online
 Gabin, Nancy. "Fallow Yet Fertile: The Field of Indiana Women's History." Indiana Magazine of History (2000) online
 Jensen, Joan M. Calling This Place Home: Women on the Wisconsin Frontier, 1850-1925 (Minnesota Historical Press: 2006).
 Johnson, Yvonne, ed. Feminist Frontiers: Women who Shaped the Midwest (Truman State Univ Press, 2010) excerpt and text search
 Murphy, Lucy Eldersveld, and Wendy Hamand Venet, eds. Midwestern Women: Work, Community, and Leadership at the Crossroads (1997), 
 Neth, Mary. Preserving the Family Farm: Women, Community, and the Foundations of Agribusiness in the Midwest, 1900-1945 (1995).
 Riley, Glenda. The Female Frontier: A Comparative View of Women on the Prairie and the Plains (1988) 
 Schlissel, Lillian. Women's Diaries of the Westward Journey (2004) excerpt
 Stuhler, Barbara, and Gretchen V. Kreuter, eds. Women of Minnesota: Selected Biographical Essays  (Minnesota Historical Society Press, 1998), 16 essays by experts covering numerous women

Primary sources
 Frederick, John T., ed. Out of the Midwest: A Collection of Present-Day Writing (1944) 428pp
 Watts, Edward, and David Rachels, eds. The First West: Writing from the American Frontier, 1776-1860 (Oxford University Press, 2002), 960pp; primary sources  excerpt and text search, long excerpts from 59 authors, chiefly Midwesterners

See also
American frontier
Great Plains
Midwestern United States
History of the Midwestern United States
Midwestern United States topics
History of Illinois
Illinois in the American Civil War
History of Chicago
History of Indiana
Indiana in the American Civil War
History of Iowa
History of Kansas
History of Michigan
Michigan in the American Civil War
History of Detroit
History of Minnesota
Minnesota in the American Civil War
History of Minneapolis
History of St. Paul
History of Missouri
Missouri in the American Civil War
History of Kansas City
History of St. Louis
History of Nebraska
Nebraska in the American Civil War
History of North Dakota
History of Ohio
Ohio in the American Civil War
History of Cleveland
History of Cincinnati
History of South Dakota
History of Wisconsin
Wisconsin in the American Civil War

Midwestern United States
Midwestern United States